The 2003 Preakness Stakes was the 128th running of the Preakness Stakes thoroughbred horse race. The race took place on May 17, 2003, and was televised in the United States on the NBC television network. Funny Cide, who was jockeyed by José A. Santos, won the race by nine and three quarter lengths over runner-up Midway Road. Approximate post time was 6:14 p.m. Eastern Time. The race was run over a track listed as good in a final time of 1:55.61.  The Maryland Jockey Club reported total attendance of 109,931, this is recorded as second highest on the list of American thoroughbred racing top attended events for North America in 2003.

Payout 

The 128th Preakness Stakes Payout Schedule

 $2 Exacta: (9–6) paid $120.60
 $2 Trifecta: (9–6–1) paid $684.20
 $1 Superfecta: (9–6–1–7) $792.20

The full chart 

 Winning Breeder: WinStar Farm; (NY)  
 Final Time:  1:55.61
 Track Condition:  Fast
 Total Attendance: 109,931

See also 

 2003 Kentucky Derby
 2003 Belmont Stakes

References

External links 

 

2003
2003 in horse racing
2003 in American sports
2003 in sports in Maryland
Horse races in Maryland